Vishal–Shekhar is a music directing duo consisting of  Vishal Dadlani and Shekhar Ravjiani. The duo is best known for their works in Hindi films.

1990s

2000s

2010s

2020s

References

Discographies of Indian artists